Kohki may refer to :

 Kōki (given name), a masculine Japanese given name
 Kohki tea, a Japanese herbal drink very high in antioxidant activity